is a unisex Japanese given name.

Different ways of writing
Although the name Nozomi is generally written with the kanji for wish 望, hope 希, のぞみ in hiragana, or ノゾミ in katakana, it can have other different meanings depending on which kanji is used. Some possible variations of Nozomi include:
臨, "face, attend, command"
望美, "wishful beauty"
望海, "wishful ocean"
望実, "wishful truth"
満, "satisfy, full"
希実, "hopeful truth"
希美, "hopeful beauty"
望魅, "wishful fascination"
希, "hope, rare'" (an example of nanori)

People with the name
Nozomi Hiroyama (廣山 望), retired Japanese soccer player
Nozomi Kawahara (川原 希), Japanese male professional golfer
Nozomi Komuro (小室 希), Japanese skeleton racer
Nozomi Masu (升 望), Japanese voice actress
Nozomi Momoi (桃井 望, 1978-2002), a Japanese AV idol
Nozomi Nakano (中野 希望), Japanese fencer who competed in the 2012 Summer Olympics  
Nozomi Ōhashi (大橋 のぞみ), Japanese child actress and singer
Nozomi Okuhara (奥原 希望), Japanese badminton player
Nozomi Ōsako (大迫 希), Japanese male soccer player
Nozomi Sasaki (disambiguation)
Nozomi Sasaki (model) (佐々木 希), Japanese female model
Nozomi Sasaki (voice actress) (ささき のぞみ/佐々木 望), Japanese voice actress
, Japanese badminton player
Nozomi Takeuchi (竹内 のぞみ/竹内 希実), Japanese gravure idol and female talent
, Japanese long-distance runner
Nozomi Tsuji (辻 希美), Japanese pop singer
Nozomi Watanabe (渡辺 心), Japanese ice dancer
Nozomi Yamago (山郷 のぞみ), Japanese soccer player
Nozomi Yamamoto (山本 希望), Japanese voice actress

Fictional characters
Nozomi Harasaki (原崎 望), character in the video game Shenmue
Nozomi Kaibara (柏原 ノゾミ), a character from the anime series Chance Pop Session
Nozomi Kaminashi (神無 のぞみ), the main protagonist of the manga/anime series Keijo
Nozomi Kujō (九条 望実), a character in the manga series Bleach
Nozomi Shirakawa (白河 望), a character in the film Linda Linda Linda
Nozomi Watabe (渡部 望み), a character in manga series Haikyū!!, the position is Libero and the number is #7.
Nozomi Yumehara (夢原 のぞみ), a character from the anime metaseries Yes! PreCure 5
Nozomi Tōjō (東條 希), a character from the anime series Love Live!
Nozomi Kiriya (霧谷 希), a character from the light novel, manga/anime series Mayoi Neko Overrun!
Nozomi (希), a character from the anime series Sonny Boy.

See also 
Nozomi (disambiguation)
Nozomu

Japanese unisex given names